Ana Marcela Dinorah Giammattei Cáceres is a Guatemalan politician and lawyer serving as current First Lady of Guatemala since January 2020. Giammattei is daughter of President Alejandro Giammattei and Rosana Cáceres.

Her parents are divorced, so she assumed the role of First Lady.

References

Living people
Date of birth missing (living people)
Year of birth missing (living people)
First ladies of Guatemala
Guatemalan women lawyers
Guatemalan people of Italian descent
21st-century Guatemalan lawyers